Gaby Bruyère (3 June 1924 - 30 August 1978) was a French actress, dancer, dramatist, and playwright.

Career

Films 
 1946: Un beau contrat, short film by 
 1946:  Symphonies, short film by Jean-Devaivre
 1946: , by Jean Boyer, Les Chevaliers de l'aventure first part: a comedian
 1947:  by Jacques Daniel-Norman
 1947:  by Maurice de Canonge as Ginette
 1947: Par la fenêtre by Gilles Grangier
 1948: Les Casse Pieds or Parade du temps perdu by Jean Dréville
 1948:  by Jacques Daroy as Colette Marly
 1948: Three Boys, One Girl by Maurice Labro as Gilbert's friend
 1948: Un cas sur mille - short film by Jean-Pierre Feydeau
 1951: Le Plaisir by Max Ophüls (sketch : Le Masque) as Frimousse
 1951: La Vérité sur Bébé Donge by Henri Decoin as the girl in the taxi
 1952: The Long Teeth by Daniel Gélin as Maud
 1952: When Do You Commit Suicide? by Émile Couzinet
 1952: Mort en sursis - short film by Jean Perdrix
 1953: Innocents in Paris by Gordon Parry : Josette

Theater 
 1948: Champagne, cigarettes et muse, musical by Dominique Nohain, Théâtre Michel
 Pardon Madame by Romain Coolus and André Rivoire
 Le Cyclone by W. Somerset Maugham
 Liberté provisoire by Michel Duran
  by Louis Verneuil and Georges Berr
 1950: Madame est servie by Georges de Wissant and Jean Kolb, Théâtre Daunou
 1951: Le Rayon des jouets by Jacques Deval, Théâtre de la Madeleine

Author

Theatre 
 1959: Cloche de mon cœur (musical), directed by Maurice Guillaud
 1964: , directed by Christian-Gérard, Théâtre de la Potinière  
 1966: , directed by Francis Joffo, Théâtre Édouard VII
 1971: , directed by Robert Manuel, Théâtre des Nouveautés

Books 
 1954: Mémoires d'une starlett, éditions Calmann-Lévy, (autobiography)

External links 
 
 Gaby Bruyère at Association de la Régie Théâtrale.

French actresses
20th-century French dramatists and playwrights
People from Mende, Lozère
1924 births
1978 deaths
20th-century French women